The Capuchin Sisters of Mother Rubatto are a religious institute of pontificial right (acronym S.C.M.R.).

It was established at Loano on 23 January 1885. by the nun Francesca Maria Rubatto, who was later beatified by Pope John Paul II in 1993. She was canonized by Pope Francis in 2022.

See also
 Sanctuary Chapel of the Blessed Francesca Rubatto

Bibliography
Annuario Pontificio per l'anno 2007, Libreria Editrice Vaticana, Città del Vaticano 2007. .
 Guerrino Pelliccia e Giancarlo Rocca (curr.), Dizionario degli Istituti di Perfezione (10 voll.), Edizioni paoline, Milano 1974–2003.

References

External links
Capuchin Sisters of Mother Rubatto 

Religious organizations established in 1885
1885 establishments in Italy
Catholic female orders and societies